Snaildartha: The Story of Jerry the Christmas Snail - A Soul Jazz Extravaganza is a 2004 jazz and spoken-word holiday album. It was composed and produced by Chris Strouth, and performed by the Snaildartha 6 combo, which includes saxophonist George Cartwright of the jazz group Curlew and storyteller and comic Matt Fugate, who wrote the text with Strouth. The album retells the story of Buddha through a small snail, Jerry the Christmas Snail, who achieves enlightenment after meeting and having adventures with other Christmas-themed animals on a pilgrimage to the North Pole, eventually meeting and bonding with Santa Claus. The title is a pun on the Buddha's birth name, Siddhartha.

Snaildartha was created in 1993 for a performance-art series at Red Eye Theater in Minneapolis. 10 years later, Strouth and Fugate recorded a revised version with saxophonist Cartwright. First issued privately as a Christmas gift, the album was later given a wider release by Innova Recordings. A remastered digital edition of Snaildartha was released by Stand Up! Records on November 13, 2020.

The album has developed a cult following thanks to  its regular inclusion in DJ Jon Solomon's daylong marathon of Christmas music on Princeton, New Jersey radio station WPRB-FM,  as well as an annual Christmas broadcast on KFAI in Minneapolis. Solomon has played the album in its entirety annually since 2004. It is routinely the highest-streamed portion of the broadcast, and has inspired some listeners to hang snail ornaments from their Christmas trees in tribute.

Critical reception
MinnPost arts critic Pamela Espeland called Snaildartha a "weird but endearing" Christmas tradition, comparing it to the Arlo Guthrie song  "Alice's Restaurant" and its ties to Thanksgiving. Avant Music News called it a "future holiday classic" and "a twisted take on the holiday season." Jason Victor Serinus, writing in Secrets of Home Theater and High Fidelity, was more ambivalent, but called the story "charming", especially Fugate's "deadpan delivery".

Track listing
All songs composed by Chris Strouth and performed by Snaildartha featuring Matt Fugate. Text written by Matt Fugate and Chris Strouth.

Credits
As told by: Matt Fugate
Sax: George Cartwright
Drums: Terry Haanen
Organ: Scott LeGere
Mixed by: Brian Jacoby
Mastered by: Bob DeMaa
Produced and directed by: Chris Strouth

References

External links
Snaildartha at Stand Up! Records

2004 Christmas albums
Jazz Christmas albums
Christmas albums by American artists
Santa Claus in fiction
Stand Up! Records albums